The three-part eight-axle articulated trams used on Freiburg im Breisgau's tram network are the DUWAG GT8s. From 1971 to 1991, they were exclusively produced for the Freiburger Verkehrs by the Düsseldorfer Waggonfabrik in three series, which is why they are defined as Typ Freiburg. They have been designed to be used uni-directionally.

Construction 
The structural requirements of Freiburg made it necessary for their own tram type to be created. This was because trams with Jacobs bogies were not suitable for the partially narrow curved radii. Freiburg's trams were based on the type used in Mannheim, also produced by Duewag and built from 1969. This was based on the classic Duewag articulate tram from 1956. In contrast to conventional articulated trams, however, the centre of gravity of Freiburg's trams were not the Jacobs bogies, but underneath the middle section, into which two tram end parts were attached. In addition to the all-axle drive, which was easier to implement, a better structure gauge was also used, totalling  of length.

After the twelve-axle tram were manufactured by the Rhein-Haardtbahn company, Freiburg's trams were regarded as the second longest tram car in the world.

Series

First Series (1971/72) 

Between the years of 1971 and 1972, the Freiburger Verkehrs AG initially obtained four vehicles using so-called Geamatic controls. They were given operating numbers 201-204. Carriage 202 (externally distinguishable bu its central double head light) was the first to receive an automatic set point adjuster. From the outset, they were designed for travel without conductors and replacing some of the obsolete and personal-intensive vehicle-type sidecars from the early 1950s, which were still based on the War Tram Cars.

They were originally equipped with a head light and cream lacquer. During the middle part of the 1980s, they were adjusted to normal trams and had two headlights installed, which were fitted to the central part next to each other. At the same time, they were repainted red and white in 1981.

In 2001, they were decommissioned for use in Freiburg. They were later used across Łódź's tram network, where they were served by Międzygminna Komunikacja Tramwajowa on line 46 to Ozorków. Tram 2-4 was later scrapped during this period.

Second Series (1981/82) 

After good experiences with the first four trams and the decision to expand the network, ten more trams were ordered towards the end of 1970s. These were commissioned in 1981 and 1982 and were given the numbers 205-214, also referred to as GT8K. They were lacquered in red and white and had two central front head lights. On journeys, there was no need for a conductor and the last type of trams with sidecars were discarded.

At a length of 2.32 metres, they are twelve centimetres wider than the trams from the first series, which in some curves of the network, required new track to be laid. An example of this was at the Schwabentor. The larger width made it possible to make trams slightly bigger than the first series. Both storeys across the two series were very high, but were now accessible in the second series by means of three normal steps. The seats were also laid out 1+2 enabling more standing passengers to board the tram.

Instead of the mechanics of the first series, the second series used a direct current controller, which was operated via a set point transmitter. It enabled acceleration and deceleration to take place without jerking. In comparison to the first series, which had scissor pantographs, the second series used single-armed pantographs.

Tram 205 is now used as an historic motor coach, tram 207 was scrapped in 2007 and trams 208 and 209 were sold to Ulm's tram network, where they were merged to form number 17 and  used as a bi-directional rail grinder. From 2012, trams 206 and 210-214 were used full-time due to the refurbishment of the GT8Zs. Previously, they were only used during peak hours and for transporting spectators to SC Freiburg home matches. Tram 206, which had already been marketed for sale, was now reactivated. In addition, they were all equipped with LED indicators. They are the only trams, alongside the Combinos, to have fitted LED indicators. The remaining trams were still being used until the completion of the GT8Z refurbishment and the delivery of the new CAF Urbos in 2017.

Third Series (1990/91) 

In 1990 and 1991, a further eleven motorised trams were obtained with numbers 221 to 231. In contrast to the second series, they were equipped with a low-floor middle section. Because of their low-lever, they are also referred to as GT8N. Otherwise, they differ from their predecessor series by means of shear current pickups. They replaced the GT4, now used in Stuttgart, in the short-term. All vehicles of this series were fitted with a dot-matrix display in 2001 and run on lines 1, 3 and 5.

Further reading 
 Dietmar Gemander/Thomas Hettinger: Freiburger Straßenbahn - Die Zeit vor der Stadtbahn; Freiburg, 2006

Transport in Baden-Württemberg
Transport in Freiburg im Breisgau
Tram vehicles of Germany
600 V DC multiple units
750 V DC multiple units